Ždírec may refer to places in the Czech Republic:

Ždírec (Česká Lípa District), a municipality and village in the Liberec Region
Ždírec (Havlíčkův Brod District), a municipality and village in the Vysočina Region
Ždírec (Jihlava District), a municipality and village in the Vysočina Region
Ždírec (Plzeň-South District), a municipality and village in the Plzeň Region
Ždírec nad Doubravou, a town in the Vysočina Region